The behaviour of a linear autonomous system around a critical point is a node if the following conditions are satisfied:

Furthermore, each path approaches the point asymptotically through a line.

References

Ordinary differential equations